Poovaranthode is a small village located in Kozhikode District, Kerala, India. As a hilltop village, it is one of the coolest places in the Malabar region. Poovaranthode has a generally humid tropical climate with a very hot season extending from March to May. The average annual rainfall is more than 3500  mm, the highest in Kozhikode district. Hindus, Christians, and Muslims coexist in harmony. It is an agricultural area and a large portion of its population are farmers. Nutmeg, cocoa, cashew, Banana and coconut are the major products. Nowadays people are used to doing pig farming and poultry farming too.

History 
Poovaranthode is an immigrant village. The ancestors were migrants from Thiruvithamkoor. Immigration was started from Kottayam, Pala and Thodupuzha. Malabar was under the Madras Presidency in independent India. Due to the large population of Central Thiruvithamkoor during the 20th century but the extent of the agricultural land remained unchanged, many migrated to Malabar as a result of cultivation. Most of the immigrants were Syrian Christians.

Location
Poovaranthode is situated at around 1,000 meters (3280.84 ft) above mean sea level in the Western Ghats mountain range. The place is about 48  km from Kozhikode city by road. The nearest airport is Calicut International Airport and the nearest railway station is Kozhikode railway station. The Western Ghats, meadows and waterfalls attract tourists. It is a beautiful area with a lot of fresh air and freshwater to enjoy.

Etymology
There are many streams in Poovananthode. On the main river, there were trees which had fallen on the flowers. In the early days, the tribals had gathered at the edge of the stream and were sitting down to rest. so the name Poovaranthode is believed to mean "Floating flowers in a stream".

Landmarks
Poovaranthode contains GLP School, St. Mary's Church, Juma masjid, Sree Udayagiri Dharmasastha Temple, Samskarika Nilayam, Vayanasala, Sisu Mandhiram, and Vanasumrashana Samadhi.

Demographics
Christians constitute a majority of the population, followed by Muslim and Hindu communities. The majority of the inhabitants are descendants of migrants from the Southern districts of Kerala (Mid-Travancore).

Transportation 
KSRTC bus service is available for transportation to Kozhikode and Thiruvambady.

References

 Cities and towns in Kozhikode district
 Thamarassery area
 Villages in Kozhikode district
 Panchayats in Koduvally Block